Anders John Aune (1 May 1923 – 13 November 2011) was a Norwegian politician. He was the county governor of Finnmark from 1974-1989. He was also a member of the Norwegian Parliament.

Personal life
Anders Aune was born on 1 May 1923 in Stjørna Municipality in Sør-Trøndelag county, Norway.  His parents were Andreas Aune, a municipal treasurer, and Josefa Dragland, a homemaker.

During the German occupation of Norway he took part in the Norwegian resistance. He was arrested in November 1943, sent from Stavern to Stettin in December 1943, then sent to Sennheim the same month and to Buchenwald one year later, where he remained until the war's end.

In 1953, he married Sigrun Wedding Johannessen.  He died on 13 November 2011.

Education and career
He graduated from the University of Oslo as cand.jur. in 1948 and worked as a civil servant.  He was a member of the municipal council for Vadsø Municipality from 1951 to 1963, serving as deputy mayor in 1951–1952 and mayor in 1953–1955 and again from 1955–1959.  He was also the director of a hospital in Finnmark from 1954-1959.  In 1963, he was appointed to be the Acting County Governor of Finnmark since the newly appointed governor (Kolbjørn Varmann) was serving in the Storting and he wanted to fulfill his term in office before moving to Finnmark.  Aune was acting governor until 1965 when Varmann could take up the role.

Originally a member of the Labour Party, Aune was elected to the Norwegian Parliament for Finnmark county in 1969, but was not re-elected in 1973.  In 1974, Varmann resigned as county governor and Aune was appointed to replace him.  He held this post from 1974 to 1989.

Aune had planned to retire after being county governor, but in the 1989 Norwegian parliamentary election, Aune stood for election for another party—a new party led by himself and called Future for Finnmark (Framtid for Finnmark). He was elected to the national parliament for this regional protest party, but again sat only one term.  In 1993, he retired.  In 1985, he was proclaimed Commander of the Royal Norwegian Order of St. Olav, and also received the Order of the White Rose.

References

1923 births
2011 deaths
People from Rissa, Norway
Labour Party (Norway) politicians
Members of the Storting
County governors of Norway
Mayors of Vadsø
University of Oslo alumni
Norwegian civil servants
Norwegian resistance members
Buchenwald concentration camp survivors
Sennheim concentration camp survivors
20th-century Norwegian politicians